Rebecca Giggs is a Perth-based Australian nonfiction writer, known for Fathoms: The World in the Whale.

Career 
Giggs studied at the University of Western Australia. She holds an LLB, BA Arts (Hons) and a PhD in ecological literary studies conferred in 2014. 

Giggs is an honorary fellow at the Macquarie University in Sydney. She was awarded the 2017 Mick Dark flagship fellowship by Varuna for "The Whale in the Room", the working title for Fathoms. She won support from Writers Victoria through the Neilma Sidney Literary Travel Fund to visit the Rachel Carson Centre for Environment and Society in Munich, Germany as a writing fellow in 2018.

As an essayist, Giggs has contributed to The Atlantic on science subjects from "Why We're Afraid of Bats" to "Human Drugs Are Polluting the Water—And Animals Are Swimming in It".

Her first book, Fathoms: The World in the Whale, was published in 2020 worldwide by Scribe and by Simon & Schuster in the USA.

Awards and recognition 
Kirkus Reviews named Fathoms in their "10 Top Summer Reads in Nonfiction" and described the book as "a thoughtful, ambitiously crafted appeal for the preservation of marine mammals".  In November 2020 Giggs won the Nib Literary Award and in February 2021 she won the Andrew Carnegie Medal for Nonfiction for Fathoms. Her book was also shortlisted for the 2020 Kirkus Prize for Nonfiction and the PEN/E. O. Wilson Literary Science Writing Award. Fathoms won the Premier's Prize for an Emerging Writer at the 2020 Western Australian Premier's Book Awards and was shortlisted for the 2021 Stella Prize. In 2021 Fathoms was shortlisted for the Wainwright Prize, alongside David Attenborough's A Life on Our Planet and others, in the Global Conservation Writing category. She was shortlisted for the 2021 Bragg UNSW Press Prize for Science Writing for "Soundings", an extract from Fathoms.

References

External links 

 Rebecca Giggs, Whale Writer – Kirkus Reviews profile by Eric Liebetrau
What Lies Beneath – review of Robert Macfarlane's Underland

 

Living people
Year of birth missing (living people)
21st-century Australian women writers
21st-century Australian writers
University of Western Australia alumni
Academic staff of Macquarie University
Australian essayists
Science communicators
Australian nature writers